Margaret Rose Orbell  (17 July 1935 – 31 July 2006) was a New Zealand author, editor and academic. She was an associate professor of Māori at the University of Canterbury from 1976 to 1994. During her career, Orbell wrote several books on Māori literature and culture, edited numerous collections of songs, poetry and stories, and brought Māori works to a wider and international audience. She was an editor of bilingual magazine Te Ao Hou / The New World in the 1960s, and expanded the magazine's literary and historical content. In 2002, she was appointed a Companion of the New Zealand Order of Merit, for services to Māori and literature.

Life and career
Orbell was born in Auckland and attended St Cuthbert's College. She later graduated from the University of Auckland, where she completed a Masters of Arts in English and a Ph.D. in anthropology. Her Ph.D. thesis was on waiata aroha (Māori love songs).

From 1962 to 1966 Orbell was the editor of bilingual quarterly Te Ao Hou / The New World, published by New Zealand's Māori Affairs Department and printed by Pegasus Press.  During her time as editor, she ensured more literary content was included in the journal, and increased the number of translations of historical Māori texts. Her husband Gordon Walters, an artist, helped with the design and arranged for more artwork to be published in its pages.

Orbell published a number of collections of Māori songs and folktales between 1968 and 1995, including many works that might otherwise have been lost. The Oxford Companion to New Zealand Literature wrote that her main achievement in these books was "to preserve fidelity to the Māori texts and their cultural connotations while arranging, introducing and translating them in ways that make them accessible to other cultures". She and her co-author of Traditional Songs of the Māori (1975), Mervyn McLean, were the first to publish Māori lyrics and music together, as previously Māori music had been largely ignored by Europeans. Providing the music together with the words enabled readers to understand how Māori music would have sounded. A review of her 1978 collection Māori Poetry: An Introductory Anthology noted that "the poetry is literature in its own right, subtle, moving and with a power to affect the emotions and thoughts of people living in today's quite different society".

Orbell's compilation of the anthology Contemporary Māori Writing (1970) included early works by a number of New Zealand Māori writers that were later to become significant figures in New Zealand literature, including Witi Ihimaera, Patricia Grace, Arapera Blank, Harry Dansey and Hirini Mead. It was the first anthology of contemporary Māori writing. New Zealand author Bill Pearson wrote a positive review of the anthology for the literary journal Landfall. A review in The Press said:

After lecturing in Māori at the University of Auckland between 1974 and 1975, Orbell moved to the University of Canterbury and became the associate professor of Māori. She retired in 1994 to return to Auckland and become a full time writer.

In the 2002 New Year Honours, Orbell was appointed a Companion of the New Zealand Order of Merit, for services to Māori and literature.

Awards
Contemporary Māori Writing (1970) came second in the 1971 James Wattie Book of the Year Award. The judging panel said it "could well become a standard work in the special field it covered", and praised its editorial work and the material covered.

Traditional Songs of the Māori (1975), with co-author Mervyn McLean, received the Award for Non-Fiction at the inaugural New Zealand Book Awards in 1976.

Illustrated Encyclopedia of Māori Myth and Legend (1995), Songs of a Kaumatua: As sung by Kino Hughes (2002) and Birds of Aotearoa: A Natural and Cultural History (2003) were finalists in the New Zealand Book Awards.

Personal life
In 1963, Orbell married Gordon Walters, a New Zealand artist. They had two children.

Selected works
 Māori Folktales in Māori and English (1968)
 Contemporary Māori Writing (1970) (editor)
 Traditional Songs of the Māori (1975, 1990, with Mervyn McLean)
 Māori Poetry: An Introductory Anthology (1978)
 Select Bibliography of the Oral Tradition of Oceania (UNESCO, Paris, 1978)
 Penguin Book of New Zealand Verse (1985) (consultant editor)
 Waiata: Māori Songs in History (1991)
 Traditional Māori Stories (1992)
 Illustrated Encyclopedia of Māori Myth and Legend (1995)
 Songs of a Kaumatua: As sung by Kino Hughes (2002, with Mervyn McLean)
 Birds of Aotearoa: A Natural and Cultural History (2003)

References

External links 
 Read NZ profile of Margaret Orbell
 Margaret Rose Orbell (1934–2006), profile at the New Zealand Electronic Text Collection archive
 Margaret Orbell Collection at the Alexander Turnbull Library

1934 births
2006 deaths
New Zealand women writers
20th-century New Zealand writers
New Zealand editors
New Zealand women editors
New Zealand magazine editors
Women magazine editors
University of Auckland alumni
Academic staff of the University of Auckland
Academic staff of the University of Canterbury
Companions of the New Zealand Order of Merit
People educated at St Cuthbert's College, Auckland